A by-election was held for the New South Wales Legislative Assembly electorate of West Sydney on 15 December 1868 because of the resignation of Samuel Joseph, who had traveled to Europe but stayed longer than he had contemplated and so resigned his seat.

Dates

Result

The by-election was caused by the resignation of Samuel Joseph who had traveled to Europe.

See also
 Electoral results for the district of West Sydney
List of New South Wales state by-elections

References

1868 elections in Australia
New South Wales state by-elections
1860s in New South Wales